This is a list of Wii U games, released physically on Wii U optical discs or for download from the Nintendo eShop. For a list of non-gaming software on the system, see Wii U system software.


Games 
There are  games on this list, 205 of which were released physically on a disc.

The list is sorted by game titles, their developer(s), publisher(s), released for and release date by Japanese, European, and American respectively. The game title without a region abbreviation in superior letters is a North American title, it may be shared in another region if there is no secondary title with matching region in superior letters.

For a chronological list, click the sort button in any of the available region's columns. Games dated December 8, 2012 (Japan), November 18, 2012 (North America), and November 30, 2012 (Europe and Australasia) are launch titles for the specified regions.

Games that were released physically are marked with a dagger.

Applications

Notes

References 

Wii U
Wii U
Wii U games